Deepface is a Dance/House/Electronica music act based out of Melbourne, Victoria, Australia. It is the studio project for Producer/Engineer/Musician Chris Corby.

Profile
The act was formed in 2004 by Corby and Francine Power and became a successful fixture in their home country's Dance music scene. The group's first single, "Been Good," was originally included on a self-titled EP and later remixed by Grant Smillie and Ivan Gough (of TV Rock fame), and became a major smash on the ARIA club and dance charts. At the ARIA Music Awards of 2005 the song was nominated for ARIA Award for Best Dance Release.

In 2006 Deepface returned to the ARIA club and dance charts with "I Want To Live", which was lifted off their debut album "Feel the Love," which was released in October 2007. The track, which has also been remixed by Chris Corby and Andy Page, has already crossed over the Pacific, where it charted on the Billboard Hot Dance Club Play chart, peaking at number 18 (in the 19 May 2007 issue).

In March 2007 Deepface was signed to Red Stick Recordings, the Strictly Rhythm Records imprint in the United States. Both the first single of "I Want To Live" (in its original version) and the Trevor Simpson vs Deepface remixes are both available commercially and has gained radio airplay in the States.

Discography

Albums

Extended plays

Singles

Awards and nominations

ARIA Music Awards
The ARIA Music Awards is an annual awards ceremony that recognises excellence, innovation, and achievement across all genres of Australian music.

|-
| 2005 || "Been Good" || ARIA Award for Best Dance Release || 
|-

References

External links
Official website

Australian pop music groups
Victoria (Australia) musical groups
Australian electronic musicians
Australian electronic dance music groups